Loggerheads was a 1925 Broadway three-act comedy written by Ralph Cullinan
and produced by Barry Macollum and Whitford Kane with Macollum also playing Padna Collins and Kane 
playing Corny Halpin. It ran for 72 performances from February 9, 1925 to April 1925 at the Cherry Lane Theatre. 
Actress Gail Kane was not related to Whitford Kane.

Cast

 Whitford Kane as Corny Halpin
 Gail Kane as Ellen Halpin
 Joanna Roos as Norah Halpin
 Barry Macollum as	Padna Collins	
 Earle House as Christie Barrett

References

External links 
 

1925 plays
Broadway plays